Na Hannyate is a 2012 Indian Bengali-language disaster drama film directed by Riingo Banerjee. The story of the film is inspired by Zhang Ling's novella "The Great Tangshan Earthquake".

Cast 
 Rahul Banerjee
 Priyanka Sarkar
 Roopa Ganguly
 Debshankar Haldar
 Dibyendu Mukherjee
 Sayani Datta
 Chaiti Ghoshal

See also 
 Charuulata 2011, 2012 Bengali film

References

2010s disaster films
Films about earthquakes
Disaster films based on actual events
Indian disaster films
2012 films
Bengali-language Indian films
2010s Bengali-language films
Films based on Chinese novels